John M. Simonton was an officer in the Confederate Army during the American Civil War and a state senator in Mississippi. He served in the Mississippi Senate from 1859 to 1869. He was President of the Senate from 1865 to 1869.

References

External links

Year of birth missing (living people)
Living people
Mississippi state senators
People of Mississippi in the American Civil War
Confederate States Army officers
19th-century American politicians